Diana Marie Munz (born June 19, 1982), later known by her married name Diana DePetro, is an American former competition swimmer and Olympic champion from Moreland Hills, Ohio. She represented the United States at the 2000 Summer Olympics in Sydney, Australia, where she won a gold medal in the women's 4×200-meter freestyle relay and a silver medal in 400-meter freestyle.  Four years later she added a bronze medal in the 800-meter freestyle to her Olympic medal collection. She also has 3 daughters; Sydney (age 11), Reagan (age 8), and Penelope (age 2).

She won four events at the 2002 Pan Pacific Swimming Championships in Yokohama; and over her career garnered five medals at the World Championships.

Munz is the daughter of Robert Munz, an ice dancer who competed at the 1964 World Figure Skating Championships.  As of August 2006, she is married to Palmer DePetro.  She has a daughter named Sydney.

As of September 2011, Munz is the Director of Swimming at the SPIRE Institute, an athletic facility in Geneva, Ohio.

See also
 List of John Carroll University people
 List of Olympic medalists in swimming (women)
 List of World Aquatics Championships medalists in swimming (women)

References

External links
 
 
 
 

1982 births
Living people
American female freestyle swimmers
John Carroll University alumni
Medalists at the 2004 Summer Olympics
Olympic gold medalists for the United States in swimming
Olympic bronze medalists for the United States in swimming
Olympic silver medalists for the United States in swimming
Sportspeople from Cleveland
Swimmers at the 2000 Summer Olympics
Swimmers at the 2004 Summer Olympics
World Aquatics Championships medalists in swimming
Medalists at the 2000 Summer Olympics
People from Cuyahoga County, Ohio
21st-century American women